Stevenson High School may refer to:
 One of the following Adlai E. Stevenson High Schools in the United States:
 Adlai E. Stevenson High School (Lincolnshire, Illinois)
 Adlai E. Stevenson High School (Livonia, Michigan)
 Adlai E. Stevenson High School (New York City)
 Adlai E. Stevenson High School (Sterling Heights, Michigan)
 Stevenson High School (Stevenson, Washington)
Stephenson High School, a public school in DeKalb County, Georgia, United States
George Stephenson High School, a secondary school in Killingworth, North Tyneside, United Kingdom.